St. Anne Street was one of the original sixteen wards established as a result of the Municipal Corporations Act 1835.

The ward ceased to exist in 1952

St. Anne's Street ward Boundary 1835-1894

"All such portions of the said borough as are included within a line drawn from the point at which Shaw's-brow meets Byrom-street, northwards along the centre of Byrom-street, to the point where the same joins Scotland-place, thence along the centre of Scotland-place, to the point at which the same joins Scotland-road, thence along the centre of Scotland-road, to the point at which the same is met by Rose-place, thence eastward along the centre of Rose-place, to the point at which the same meets the boundary line of the township of Everton, thence south-ward along the boundary of the Lime-street Ward, to the point first described."

St. Anne's ward Boundary 1895-1952

Councillors 1835-1952

See also

 Liverpool City Council
 Liverpool Town Council elections 1835–1879
 Liverpool City Council elections 1880–present
 List of electoral wards in Merseyside
 Mayors and Lord Mayors of Liverpool 1207 to present
 West Derby Hundred
 History of local government in England
 Timeline of Liverpool

References

External links
Liverpool City Council

Defunct wards of Liverpool